Mary Sawyer may refer to:

Mary Sawyer (tennis) (born 1957), Australian professional tennis player
Mollie Monroe (1846-1902), American old west identity, born Mary Sawyer
Mary Sawyer, Tom Sawyer's female cousin in The Adventures of Tom Sawyer